Rhodes is an unincorporated community in Clinton Township, Vermillion County, in the U.S. state of Indiana.

History
Rhodes was founded in 1903 as a mining community.

Geography

References

Unincorporated communities in Vermillion County, Indiana
Unincorporated communities in Indiana